Atatürk Bridge is a road bridge across the Golden Horn in Istanbul, Turkey. It is named after Mustafa Kemal Atatürk, the founder and first President of the Republic of Turkey but is sometimes called the Unkapanı Bridge after he district on its western shore.

History 
Originally named the Hayratiye Bridge, it was commissioned by the  reformist Ottoman Sultan Mahmud II and supervised by Ahmed Fevzi Pasha, the Deputy Admiral of the Ottoman Fleet. The work was completed in 1836 and connected Unkapanı on the western side of the Golden Horn with  Azapkapı on the eastern side. Sultan Mahmud II attended the opening of the bridge in 1836, crossing over it on his horse.

In 1875 the original bridge was replaced by a second model, made of iron and constructed by a French company for the price of 135,000 Ottoman gold liras.

In 1912, the nearby Third Galata Bridge was disassembled and reassembled on the site of the old Hayratiye Bridge, becoming the third bridge on the site. This bridge continued in use until 1936 when it was damaged by a storm.

The fourth and current bridge, renamed the Atatürk Bridge, was constructed between 1936 and 1940.

In 2022 the Unkapanı access area was completely remodelled to allow the extension of the T5 tram from Alibeyköy to be extended from Cibali to Eminönü.

See also
 Galata Bridge
 Haliç Bridge
 Golden Horn Metro Bridge
 Golden Horn

References

External links
 
 Türkçe Bilgi: Unkapanı Atatürk Köprüsü

Bridges in Istanbul
Bridges completed in 1940
Golden Horn
Fatih
Beyoğlu
Road bridges in Turkey
Bridge